Eugène Van Roosbroeck (13 May 1928 – 28 March 2018) was a Belgian racing cyclist from Noorderwijk (Antwerp province). He won a gold medal in team road race at the 1948 Summer Olympics in London, together with Lode Wouters and Leon De Lathouwer.

After that Olympic race, the Belgian cyclists were not aware that there was a team competition, and returned to Belgium, missing the medal ceremony. Many years later, Van Roosbroeck heard that André Nelis was given a copy of his lost medal, and requested the Belgian Olympic Committee to get the medal that he never received, and was given one in 2010.

References

External links

1928 births
2018 deaths
Cyclists from Antwerp
Belgian male cyclists
Cyclists at the 1948 Summer Olympics
Olympic cyclists of Belgium
Olympic gold medalists for Belgium
Olympic medalists in cycling
Medalists at the 1948 Summer Olympics